The Amburiq Masjid is a mosque located in Shigar, in the Gilgit-Baltistan region of Pakistan. It is one of the oldest mosques in Baltistan. The mosque was built by Sayed Ali Hamdani and is among the famous landmarks in Baltistan.

Mosque Museum

A small museum has been established inside the mosque, which has been helping to create awareness of the historical significance of the site, and to instill a conservational approach among the local community towards socially significant structures.

Renovation and support
Restoration was completed in 1998–2000. The cost of the mosque renovation was provided by Norwegian Embassy Islamabad, and the local community where the AKCSP provided technical assistance and supervised the project.

Awards of Merit
 In 2005, UNESCO awarded Asia-Pacific Heritage Awards to the mosque.

Gallery

See also
 Chaqchan Mosque
 Skardu Fort Mosque

References 

Tibetan architecture
Cultural heritage sites in Gilgit-Baltistan
Mosques in Gilgit-Baltistan
Shigar District